Gianluca D'Angelo (born 13 March 1991) is a Swiss professional footballer.

Club career
D'Angelo began his playing career at FC Schwamendingen before moving on to Grasshopper where he rose through the youth ranks, playing regularly for the reserve team. He eventually made his Swiss Super League debut on 19 July 2009 against FC Sion, coming on as a substitute. During the second half of the 2010–11 season, he went on loan to Swiss Challenge League side FC Schaffhausen making his debut against FC Lugano on 4 April 2011. At the start of the 2011–12 season D'Angelo again went on loan to a second division club, this time AC Bellinzona. He made his debut on 23 July 2011 against SR Delémont.

International career
D'Angelo is currently a Switzerland youth international having played at under-19 level. He was also named in a 50-man preliminary squad called up for the 2012 Summer Olympics in London but did not make the final team.

References

External links
 Career history at SFV
 

1991 births
Footballers from Zürich
Living people
Association football midfielders
Swiss people of Italian descent
Swiss men's footballers
Switzerland youth international footballers
Grasshopper Club Zürich players
FC Schaffhausen players
AC Bellinzona players
FC Winterthur players
Swiss Super League players
Swiss Challenge League players
Swiss 1. Liga (football) players
2. Liga Interregional players